Worldport can refer to:

Terminal 3, also known as Worldport, at John F. Kennedy International Airport in New York City
Port of Los Angeles, also known as WORLDPORT LA
Worldport (UPS air hub), at Louisville International Airport in Louisville, Kentucky